Michael George Klim, OAM (born 13 August 1977) is a Polish-born Australian swimmer, Olympic gold medallist, world champion, and former world record-holder of the 1990s and 2000s. He is known as the creator of straight arm freestyle.

Early years
Klim was born in Gdynia, Poland. He was educated at the University High School, Melbourne and Wesley College, Melbourne where he was later employed as the college's elite head coach of swimming. Klim began swimming after falling out of a window, when it was suggested to him that a low impact exercise would aid his recovery.

Career
Klim was first selected to represent Australia in the 1994 Commonwealth Games in Victoria, British Columbia, Canada, while still a student at Wesley College, Melbourne. For his achievements he was named the Male Swimmer of the Year by Swimming World Magazine in 1997.

In 1999, he set a world record in the 100 m butterfly twice, in a FINA-sanctioned time trial (51.81 s). It was broken at the 2003 World Championships in Barcelona by the Ukrainian Andriy Serdinov in the first semifinal of the 100 m butterfly, and then broken another time in the next semifinal by Michael Phelps.  Phelps's record was bested by Ian Crocker in the final the following day.

Klim was Australian Institute of Sport Athlete of the Year in 1998 and 1999 and was inducted into the AIS ' Best of the Best' in 2001. Klim was the only Australian to win a gold medal at both the Sydney 2000 Olympics and the 2006 Melbourne Commonwealth Games.

On 26 June 2007 Klim retired from competitive swimming; he finished the year ranked 94 in the 100 freestyle with the Olympics 14 months away. However on 14 February 2011 Klim announced his return to competitive swimming, hoping to compete in the London 2012 Olympics. Ultimately Klim failed to qualify for the team and he retired from competitive swimming for a second time.

Medal achievements
In 1996, he arrived at the Atlanta Olympics ranked first in the world for the 200 m freestyle, but was surprisingly eliminated in the heats. He rebounded to qualify for a finals in the 100m butterfly, and swam the freestyle leg in the 4×100 m medley relay, in which Australia claimed a bronze medal.
Atlanta Olympics (USA) :
 Men's 4×100m Medley Relay.

1998 was Michael Klim's year in the sun. In January, the World Aquatics Championships were held in Perth, Western Australia, and in front of a boisterous home crowd, he was the leading swimmer of the meet. He triumphed in the 200 m freestyle and the 100 m butterfly, and added silver in the 100 m freestyle, and bronze in the 50 m freestyle. He was a member of each of Australia's three relay teams, winning gold in the 4×200 m freestyle relay and 4×100 m medley relay, and a silver in the 4×100 m freestyle relay.
FINA World Championships 1998 in Perth, Australia:
 200m Freestyle.
 100m Freestyle.
 50m Freestyle.
 100m Butterfly.
 4×100m Freestyle Relay.
 4×200m Freestyle Relay.
 4×100m Medley Relay.

At the 2000 Summer Olympics, Klim set a world record (48.18) leading off the 4×100 m freestyle relay, which paved the way for a world record (3:13.67). Three days later, he was part of the 4×200 m freestyle relay, which set another world record (7:07.05), which left the opposition over 5 seconds in arrears on its way to victory. His 100m freestyle world record bested by Pieter van den Hoogenband in the semi's, in the final he finished with a bitter 4th place, he turned first at the wall but he claimed his legs gave away in the second half. In the 100 m butterfly, he was the world record holder, again turning first at the wall heavily under world record pace, but was cut down in the closing stages by Sweden's Lars Frölander, finishing second. On the final night he claimed silver as part of the 4×100 m medley relay team.
2000 Summer Olympics in Sydney, Australia:
 100m Butterfly.
 4×100m Freestyle Relay.
 4×200m Freestyle Relay.
 4×100m Medley Relay.

In 2001, hampered by an ankle injury Klim was restricted to relay duties, and contributed to another world record, winning gold in the 4×200 m relay (7:04.66). He also collected a gold medal in the 4×100 m freestyle relay.
FINA World Championships 2001 in Fukuoka, Japan:
 4×100m Freestyle Relay.
 4×200m Freestyle Relay.

In 2002 and 2003, due to chronic back and shoulder problems, Michael Klim was inactive throughout these years.

Klim failed to qualify for the 2004 Athens Olympics, but was later selected as part of the relay team, which came second behind USA in the 4×200m, race. The relay team did not win a medal in the 4x100m and failed to qualify for the medley relay final.
2004 Summer Olympics in Athens, Greece:
 4×200m Freestyle Relay.

In 2005, Klim swam at the World Aquatics in Montreal, returning to individual action, but failed to progress to the finals in the 50m & 100m Freestyle. He won bronze as part of the 4×100 m freestyle relay.
FINA World Championships 2005 in Montreal, Canada:
 4×100m Freestyle Relay.

In 2007, he swam as part of the B team in the Men's 4 × 100 metre medley relay, in the final the Australian team won the gold medal.
2007 World Aquatics Championships in Melbourne, Australia:
 4×100m Medley Relay.

Personal life
Klim married Lindy Rama, a former model and fashion entrepreneur, in April 2006. The couple have two daughters, and a son. Klim and Lindy announced their separation in February 2016. Michael Klim shares custody of his children with his ex-wife and continues to live in Bali with his current partner Michelle Owen 

After his second  retirement from swimming Klim became founder and CEO of a skin care company named "Milk and Co". He has since stepped away from that business to establish his swim school in Bali, Klim Swim. Klim supports the St Kilda Saints in the Australian Football League.

In July 2022, Klim revealed that he had been diagnosed with the auto-immune disorder chronic inflammatory demyelinating polyneuropathy in 2020, which has affected his legs and feet and left him struggling to walk unassisted.

See also 
 List of Commonwealth Games medallists in swimming (men)
 List of Olympic medalists in swimming (men)
 World record progression 50 metres butterfly
 World record progression 100 metres butterfly
 World record progression 100 metres freestyle
 World record progression 4 × 100 metres freestyle relay
 World record progression 4 × 200 metres freestyle relay

References

External links
 
 
 
 

1977 births
Living people
Australian male butterfly swimmers
Australian male freestyle swimmers
Olympic swimmers of Australia
Swimmers at the 2004 Summer Olympics
Swimmers at the 2000 Summer Olympics
Swimmers at the 1996 Summer Olympics
Recipients of the Medal of the Order of Australia
Australian people of Polish descent
World record setters in swimming
Olympic gold medalists for Australia
Olympic silver medalists for Australia
Olympic bronze medalists for Australia
Australian Swimmers of the Year
Swimmers from Melbourne
Sportspeople from Gdynia
Australian Institute of Sport swimmers
Commonwealth Games gold medallists for Australia
Commonwealth Games silver medallists for Australia
Commonwealth Games bronze medallists for Australia
People educated at Wesley College (Victoria)
Olympic bronze medalists in swimming
World Aquatics Championships medalists in swimming
Medalists at the FINA World Swimming Championships (25 m)
Medalists at the 2004 Summer Olympics
Medalists at the 2000 Summer Olympics
Medalists at the 1996 Summer Olympics
Olympic gold medalists in swimming
Olympic silver medalists in swimming
Commonwealth Games medallists in swimming
Goodwill Games medalists in swimming
Swimmers at the 1998 Commonwealth Games
Swimmers at the 2006 Commonwealth Games
Competitors at the 2001 Goodwill Games
Polish emigrants to Australia
Medallists at the 1998 Commonwealth Games
Medallists at the 2006 Commonwealth Games